Arnreit is a municipality in Upper Austria in Rohrbach District. It has 1154 inhabitants (as of 1 January 2018). Arnreit is located at an altitude of 604m above sea level in the central area of the Rohrbach district in Mühlviertel.

Population

Localities 
The municipality includes the following localities (with population as of January 1, 2018):

 Arnreit (141)
 Daim (118)
 Eckersberg (41)
 Etzerreit (57)
 Getzing (24)
 Stallion (16)
 Högling (15)
 Hölling (86)
 Humenberg (73)
 Iglbach (0)
 Katzenbach (29)
 Liebenstein (182)
 Moosham (41)
 Partenreit (88)
 Schoenberg (10)
 Schoersching (43)
 Stierberg (88)
 Untergahleiten (39)
 Wippling (63)

References

Cities and towns in Rohrbach District